Dingindaba Jonah Buyoya (born 7 February 1997 in Choma) is a multi-award-winning Zambian journalist, winner of the BBC Komla Dumor Award 2022 and television presenter at Diamond Television, a leading private TV station in Lusaka Zambia.

Education and career
Jonah studied at St. Edmunds' Secondary School and is currently pursuing a qualifications at Cavendish University and Zambian Open University.

He began presenting news at Diamond Television in 2017 and has been at the station since then, often interviewing politicians and Zambian public figures on national issues.

References

Living people
1997 births
People from Choma District
People from Lusaka